Louise Fishman (January 14, 1939 – July 26, 2021) was an American abstract painter from Philadelphia, Pennsylvania. For many years she lived and worked in New York City, where she died.

Biography
Louise Fishman was born in Philadelphia on January 14, 1939. She attended the Philadelphia College of Art between 1956 and 1957. In 1958 she attended the Pennsylvania Academy of the Fine Arts in Philadelphia. After being successful at both schools she went on to receive her BFA and BS at the Tyler School of Art in Elkins Park, Pennsylvania, and in 1965 she secured her MFA from the University of Illinois at Urbana–Champaign. Following her MFA, Fishman worked as a library assistant at Cooper from 1966 to 1968, and also served as an adjunct instructor at the college.

Artistic career
Fishman's painting style at first gave her some trouble in being recognized. She exhibited only occasionally in the 1960s, a period in her life when she produced primarily grid-based work. During the later 1970s her abstract work was linked with Pattern painting. Large scale works like Grand Slam (1985) and Cinnabar and Malachite (1986) reflected her bold visions, and caused many reviewers to label her work as having elements of neo-expressionism.

In 1980 she was one of the ten invited artists whose work was exhibited in the main event of the Great American Lesbian Art Show.

As the feminist movement gained strength in the 1970s, Fishman abandoned her minimalist-inspired, grid-like paintings and began making work that reflected women's traditional tasks. These pieces required the sort of repetitive steps that characterize activities like knitting, piecing, or stitching. Returning later to the masculine realm of abstract painting, Fishman still sought a way to distinguish what she was doing from the work of male artists, both historic and contemporary. The resulting compositions combine gestural brushwork with an orderly structure: it is as if Fishman built or wove—her paintings, starting from a foundation and carefully adding to them, layer upon interlocking layer.

In 1988, Fishman accompanied a friend who survived the Holocaust at both Auschwitz and Terezin. This trip was part of a larger one that took her to Warsaw, Prague, and Budapest. This trip had a dramatic impact on her life as an artist, altered her way of working, and helped her to "investigate her Jewish identity." She returned with ashes, cremated human remains – from Auschwitz. She mixed the ashes with beeswax to use in her paints for the series Remembrance and Renewal. These paintings served as abstract art as well as memorials to a tragic and obscene event in history.

In the early 1990s she returned to painting grids in a slightly altered format. This can be seen in works such as Sipapu (1991) and Shadows and Traces (1992)

The organization of Fishman's work derived ultimately from the grid, which was key 35 years ago, is vestigially apparent though less and less important. Some of the mark-making in the current paintings inclines toward writing, as has been true for around a decade.

In the fall of 2011, Fishman completed her residency at the Emile Harvey Foundation in Venice. She cited her residency in Venice as an important influence on her most recent work. Likewise, the work of Venetian artist Titian was an important inspiration during this period of her work.

Awards
Senior Art Prize, Tyler School –1963
Change, Inc. Award –1975
National Endowment for the Arts Grant – 1975, 1983, 1994
Guggenheim Fellowship – 1979
CAPS Fellowship – 1981
New York Foundation for the Arts Fellowship – 1986
Adolph & Esther Gottlieb Foundation Grant – 1986
National Endowment for the Arts, Painting - 1994
Adolph & Clara Obrig Prize for Painting, National Academy of Design, 177th Annual Exhibition, 5/1st -2002

Individual exhibitions
1964     Philadelphia Art Alliance
1964     Nancy Hoffman Gallery, New York
1967     University of Rhode Island, Kingston
John Doyle Gallery, Chicago
1977     Nancy Hoffman Gallery, New York
1978     Department of State, Washington, D.C.
1979     Nancy Hoffman Gallery, New York
855 Mercer, New York
1980     Oscarsson-Hood Gallery, New York
1982     Oscarsson-Hood Gallery, New York
1984     Backerville & Watson Gallery, New York
1985     North Carolina Museum of Art, Raleigh, North Carolina
1986     Backerville & Watson Gallery, New York
1987     Winston Gallery, Washington, D.C.
1989     Simon Watson Gallery, New York
Lennon, Weinberg, New York
1991     Lennon, Weinberg, New York
1992     Olin Art Gallery, Kenyon College, Gambier, Ohio
Simon Watson Gallery, New York
Morris Gallery, Pennsylvania Academy of Fine Arts, Philadelphia
Temple Gallery, Tyler School of Fine Arts, Philadelphia
1993     Robert Miller Gallery, New York
1994     Bianca Lanza Gallery, Miami
1995     Robert Miller Gallery, New York
1996     Robert Miller Gallery, New York
1998     Cheim & Read, New York
2000     Paule Anglim, SF
2001     Manny Silverman, LA
2003     Cheim & Read, New York
2004     Manny Silverman, LA
2005     Foster Gwin, SF
2006     Cheim & Read, New York
2007     Dartmouth College, New Hampshire
2008     Galerie Kienzle & Gmeiner, Berlin
2009     Cheim & Read, New York
2009     Museum of Art, Sarasota, FL
2009     The John & Mable Ringling
2010     Paule Anglim, SF
2012     Jack Tilton Gallery, New York
2012     John Davis Gallery, Hudson, NY
2012      Cheim & Read, New York
2013      Goya Contemporary, Baltimore, MD
2014      Gallery Nosco, London, UK
2015      Cheim & Read, New York
2016      Institute of Contemporary Art, Philadelphia

Notes

References
 Hillstrom, Laurie C., and Kevin Hillstrom, eds. Contemporary Women Artists. Detroit: St. James P, 1999. 205-206.
Princenthal, Nancy. Louise Fishman at Cheim & Read. Art in America; May2006, Vol. 94 Issue 5, p182-182, 1/2p
 Carla Williams, American Art: Lesbian, Post-Stonewall, glbtq.com
 Six Painters: Gregory Amenoff, Jake Berthot, Howard Buchwald, Louise Fishman, Harry Kramer, Katherine Porter (exh. cat., New York, Hudson River Mus., 1983)
 Louise Fishman: Art and Identity (exh. cat., ed. W. Kendall-Hess and E. Whittemore; Akron, OH, A. Mus.; New York, Jew. Mus., 1994)
 Louise Fishman: The Tenacity of Painting, Paintings from 1970 to 2005 (exh. cat., Hanover, NH, Dartmouth Coll., 2007)

External links 
 Louise Fishman at Cheim & Read Gallery
 The Whitney Museum of American Art
 Brooklyn Museum
 Venice Watercolours 2011-1013 at Gallery Nosco
 Archives of American Art, Smithsonian Institute: Oral History Interview

1939 births
2021 deaths
20th-century American women artists
American contemporary painters
American printmakers
American women printmakers
American women painters
Artists from Philadelphia
Feminist artists
Painters from Pennsylvania
University of the Arts (Philadelphia) alumni
University of Illinois Urbana-Champaign alumni
21st-century American women artists